Café Hillel is a cafe, espresso bar, and sandwich bar chain in Israel established in 1998 by Koby and Yossi Sherf that has over 25 national locations. The German Colony branch of café was the site of the 2003 Café Hillel bombing.

History
In 1998, Koby and Yossi Sherf opened the first branch of Café Hillel on Jerusalem's Hillel Street, the source of the chain's name. They envisioned a coffee shop with a relaxed "Jerusalemite" atmosphere serving world-class coffee and food.

Most of the branches are run by franchises, with only two or three owned directly by the company.

In 2003, seven people were killed and over 50 wounded in the Café Hillel bombing, a suicide attack at Jerusalem's German Colony branch of the cafe. Dr. David Applebaum, an emergency room doctor who had treated numerous suicide attack victims himself, was killed along with his 20-year-old daughter Nava Applebaum, who was to be married the next day.

The chain now has over 25 branches around the country. Cafe Hillel sells its own private label coffee and has a red and black color scheme.

See also

 Aroma Espresso Bar
 Café Café
 List of restaurants in Israel

References

External links
Café Hillel website

Food and drink companies of Israel
Coffeehouses and cafés in Israel
Restaurants established in 1998
Restaurant chains in Israel
1998 establishments in Israel
Restaurants in Jerusalem
Restaurants in Tel Aviv